The Field Elm cultivar Ulmus minor 'Retiro' was raised from seed collected in 2002 from a tree growing in the El Retiro park, in the centre of Madrid by researchers at the Escuela Técnica Superior de Ingenieros de Montes, Universidad Politėcnica de Madrid.  

'Retiro' was introduced to the UK in 2015, by Hampshire & Isle of Wight Branch, Butterfly Conservation, as part of an assessment of DED-resistant cultivars as potential hosts of the endangered White-letter Hairstreak.

Description
'Retiro' grew at a comparatively modest rate of 70 cm per annum in the trials at Puerta de Hierro, Madrid. The erect branches, devoid of corky tissue, form a globular crown. The leaves, on 7 mm petioles, are elliptic, typically acuminate at the apex, the average length and width 71 × 42 mm, the margins doubly serrate. Foliar density relative to 'Sapporo Autumn Gold' is described as 'high'. In the Madrid study, the appearance of the tree was rated 4 / 5.  The tree begins leafing in mid April (week 15) in southern England, where it also began suckering from roots, the first of the Madrid U. minor clones to do so, at age 7;  flowering began at age 9.

Pests and diseases
'Retiro' is one of a number found to have a very high resistance to Dutch Elm Disease, on a par with, if not greater than,  the hybrid cultivar 'Sapporo Autumn Gold'.

Cultivation
The cultivar is (2018) undergoing further trials in a different environment in Spain, where it was tested by inoculation in 2016. If resistance is still considered satisfactory, the tree will be released to commerce under licence. 'Retiro' is also being assessed as part of Butterfly Conservation's elm trials in southern Hampshire, England.

Accessions

Europe
Grange Farm Arboretum, Lincolnshire, UK. Acc. no. 1269.
 Great Fontley Butterfly Conservation Elm Trials plantation, UK. One sapling planted 2015.

References

Field elm cultivar
Ulmus articles with images
Ulmus
Technical University of Madrid elm clones